Frédéric Blanc (born 1967) is a French composer, organist and improvisor. The last student of Marie-Madeleine Duruflé, he is based as titular organist of Notre-Dame d'Auteuil in Paris. He has played concerts and given masterclasses internationally, especially in the United States. He is focused on the French organ tradition and improvisation.

Life 
Born in Bordeaux in 1967, Blanc first studied law for a year, then organ at the conservatories of Toulouse and Bordeaux with André Fleury, Marie-Claire Alain, Pierre Cogen and, from 1991, with Marie-Madeleine Duruflé. He lived in the Duruflés' apartmentment after they died, as custodian of their estate, including manuscripts, documents, correspondence, photographs and their library.

From 1987 to 1995, he was assistant organist at the Basilica of Saint-Sernin, Toulouse, and from 1993 to 1999 lecturer in organ at the Conservatoire de Bordeaux. Since 1999, Blanc has been titular organist at Notre-Dame d'Auteuil in Paris which features a Cavaillé-Coll organ. In August 2003, he was a lecturer at the International Altenberg Organ Academy for Improvisation. He is also a member of the organ commission of Paris and a member of the commission for non-historic organs in the music department of the French Ministry of Culture.

Blanc has held organ masterclasses, for example at the Royal Academy of Music in London and increasingly at U.S. universities, such as Valparaiso University, Indiana, Stanford University, California, Hope College in Holland, Michigan, Northwestern University in Evanston, Illinois, Southern Methodist University in Dallas, the Curtis Institute of Music in Philadelphia, University of Michigan and Arizona State University.

Competitions 

 1996: Second prize at the 
 1996: Audience prize at the organ competition of the 
 1997: Grand Prix d'improvisation, at the international organ competition

Publications 
 Frédéric Blanc, François Sabatier (ed.): André Fleury (1903–1995). In: L'Orgue: Cahiers et memoirs No. 55. Association des Amis de l'Orgue, Paris 1996.
 Maurice Duruflé – Mémoires et écrits 1936–1986. , Biarritz 2005, .
 Berceuse à la mémoire de Louis Vierne. Reconstruction of improvisations by Pierre Cochereau. Éditions Chantraine/Musikverlag Dr. J. Butz, 1997.

Recordings 
 
 
 Live Improvisations. 1999, Aeolus AE-10091, CD (Organs of Chartres Cathedral, Bonn Minster, Angoulême Cathedral and Saint-Sernin, Toulouse). 
 Hommage à André Fleury Vol. 2. 2002, Aeolus AE-10151, CD (Église Notre-Dame-d'Auteuil). 
 Improvisations pour le temps pascal, Improvisations on Easter themes, Baroque Notes 2003, CD (Aeolian Skinner organ of the Perkins Chapel of the Dallas University).

References

Further reading

External links 
 
 

French classical organists
20th-century classical composers
21st-century classical composers
French composers of sacred music
Musicians from Bordeaux
1967 births
Living people